The simple station Pradera is part of the TransMilenio mass-transit system of Bogotá, Colombia, which opened in the year 2000.

Location 
The station is located in the industrial sector of the city, specifically on Avenida de Las Américas with Carrera 65. It serves the Pradera, Salazar Gómez, and Lusitania neighborhoods. It is also the nearest station to the recording studios of RCN Television.

History 
In 2003 and 2004, the Las Américas line was extended from Distrito Grafiti to Transversal 86, including this station.

The station receives its name from the neighborhood located on the southern side of Avenida de Las Américas.

Station services

Old trunk services

Main line service

Feeder routes 
This station does not have connections to feeder routes.

Inter-city service

This station does not have inter-city service.

External links 
 TransMilenio

See also 
 Bogotá
 TransMilenio
 List of TransMilenio Stations

TransMilenio